The Chesme Column is a rostral column (a type of victory column) in the Catherine Park at the Catherine Palace, a former Russian royal residence at Tsarskoye Selo, a suburb of Saint Petersburg. The column commemorates three Russian naval victories in the 1768–1774 Russo-Turkish War: the Battle of Chios, the Battle of Chesma and the Battle of Mytilene. It was constructed from 1774 to 1778 in the large pond of the landscape park of the Catherine Palace to Antonio Rinaldi's designs.

The monument is a Doric rostral column made from three pieces of white-and-pink marble; this raspberry quartzite was quarried in Karelia, at the villages of Shyoltozero, Shoksha, and Rybreka, the only place in the world where it was commercially mined. The column is decorated with the rostra of three ships' bows, and crowned by a bronze figure of an eagle (a symbol of Russia) crushing a crescent (a symbol of Turkey). The column stands on a grey marble pedestal, on three sides of which are bronze bas-reliefs illustrating the Russian victories, while the fourth side is inscribed with a description of the battles. The bas-reliefs were destroyed by the Germans during World War II, and subsequently replaced using old photographs. The column was reopened in June 1996, commemorating the 300th anniversary of the Russian Navy. The pedestal rests on a stepped pyramid-like granite platform, with an arched opening with a grille leading to a flight of steps providing access to the pedestal.

Gallery

References

Monumental columns in Russia
Monuments and memorials in Saint Petersburg
Buildings and structures in Pushkin
Victory monuments
Buildings and structures completed in 1778
Sculptures of birds
Cultural heritage monuments of federal significance in Saint Petersburg